Hell on Earth may refer to:

Film and television 
 Hell on Earth (film), a 1931 German war film directed by Victor Trivas
 Hell on Earth, a 2007 television film featuring Kyla Pratt
 Hell on Earth, a 2008 film directed by Ted A. Bohus
 Hell on Earth, a documentary presented by Mark Kermode about the film The Devils
 Hellraiser III: Hell on Earth, a 1992 horror film
 "Hell on Earth" (Smash), an episode of Smash
 "Hell on Earth 2006", an episode of South Park

Games 
 Doom II: Hell on Earth, the sequel to Doom
 Deadlands: Hell on Earth, an alternate-history role-playing game
 "Hell on Earth", a level of Doom Eternal

Literature 
 Hell on Earth (book series), a dark paranormal novel series by Jackie Kessler
 Hell on Earth, a 1985 DC Graphic Novel by Robert Bloch et al.
 B.P.R.D. Hell on Earth, a story cycle in Mike Mignola's B.P.R.D. comics series

Music 
 Hell on Earth (band), an American industrial-metal band
 Hell on Earth Tour, a 2009 metal music tour that included Earth Crisis

Albums
 Hell on Earth (Mobb Deep album) or the title song (see below), 1996
 Hell on Earth (Toxic Holocaust album) or the title song, 2005
 Hell on Earth: A Tribute to the Misfits, 2000
 Hell on Earth, a series of DVDs by Manowar

Songs
 "Front Lines (Hell on Earth)", by Mobb Deep, 1996
 "Hell on Earth", by Iron Maiden from Senjutsu, 2021

Places 
 Andkhoy (city), Afghanistan, described by Persians as "a Hell upon Earth"

See also 
 
 
 Hell (disambiguation)